The Big Delirium is a 1975 French drama film directed by Dennis Berry.

Cast
 Jean Seberg - Emily
 Pierre Blaise - Pierre
 Wolfgang Preiss - Artmann
 Isabelle Huppert - Marie
 Yves Beneyton - John
 Georges Adet
 Gladys Berry
 Stefania Casini
 Jacques Debary
 Antonia Lotito
 Danièle Nègre

See also
 Isabelle Huppert on screen and stage

References

External links

1975 films
French drama films
1970s French-language films
Films directed by Dennis Berry
1970s French films